Gummerus is a surname that may refer to:

 Herman Gummerus (1877–1948), Finnish classical scholar, diplomat, and one of the founders of the Patriotic People's Movement (IKL)
 Lauri Pihkala (né Gummerus, 1888–1981), the inventor of pesäpallo, the Finnish variant of baseball
 Leo Gummerus (1885–1956), Finnish Lutheran clergyman and politician